Fremont Township is a township in Johnson County, Iowa, USA.

History
Fremont Township was organized in 1857. It is named for John C. Frémont, candidate in the 1856 United States presidential election.

References

Townships in Johnson County, Iowa
Townships in Iowa
1857 establishments in Iowa
Populated places established in 1857